Hunters Creek or Hunter Creek may refer to a location in the United States:

 Hunter Creek, Arizona, a census-designated place
 Hunter's Creek, Florida, a census-designated place in Orange County
 Hunters Creek Village, Texas, a city in Harris County
 Hunter Creek (Bryant Creek), a stream in Missouri
 Hunter Creek (St. Francis River), a stream in Missouri
 Hunter Creek (Columbia River), a stream in Washington
 Sgt. Mark A. Rademacher Memorial Park, commonly known as "Hunters Creek Park", in Erie County, New York